Miss Jackie may refer to:

Jackie Gayda, (born 1981), American professional wrestler
Miss Jackie of the Navy, a 1916 film starring Margarita Fischer
Miss Jackie of the Army, a 1917 film starring Margarita Fischer
Lady Jaye Breyer P-Orridge (1969 – 2007), American performance artist and musician